Janis: Little Girl Blue is a 2015 American documentary film directed by Amy J. Berg, about the American singer-songwriter Janis Joplin. It was premiered at the 2015 Venice Film Festival and then shown in the TIFF Docs section of the 2015 Toronto International Film Festival.

Cast

 Chan Marshall as Narrator
 Janis Joplin (archive footage)
 Peter Albin
 Sam Andrew
 Dick Cavett
 David Dalton
 Clive Davis
 Cass Elliot (archive footage)
 Melissa Etheridge
 Dave Getz
 Jimi Hendrix (archive footage)
 Kris Kristofferson
 John Lennon (archive footage)
 Juliette Lewis
 Country Joe McDonald
 Alecia Moore
 Dave Niehaus
 Yoko Ono (archive footage)
 D. A. Pennebaker
 Otis Redding (archive footage)
 Powell St. John
 Bob Weir

Reception
The film received positive reviews from critics. The review aggregator website Rotten Tomatoes reports a 94% score, based on 78 reviews, with an average rating of 7.48/10. Metacritic reports a 74 out of 100 score, based on 20 critics, indicating "generally favorable reviews".

References

External links
 
 
 
 

2015 films
2015 documentary films
American documentary films
Documentary films about singers
Documentary films about women in music
Films directed by Amy J. Berg
Films set in California
Films set in San Francisco
Films set in Texas
Films shot in Texas
Janis Joplin
Woodstock Festival
American Masters films
2010s English-language films
2010s American films